Ouk Sovann (born 15 May 1998) is a Cambodian footballer currently playing as a defender for Visakha in the Cambodian League, and the Cambodia national team

Career statistics

International

References

External links
 

1998 births
Living people
Cambodian footballers
Cambodia international footballers
Association football defenders
Phnom Penh Crown FC players
Visakha FC players
Cambodian Premier League players